Sorokino is a rural locality (a village) in Zavrazhskoye Rural Settlement, Nikolsky District, Vologda Oblast, Russia. The population was 70 as of 2002.

Geography 
Sorokino is located 31 km southeast of Nikolsk (the district's administrative centre) by road. Starygino is the nearest rural locality.

References 

Rural localities in Nikolsky District, Vologda Oblast